The Tuba City Unified School District is the school district headquartered in Tuba City, Arizona. It operates a Tuba City High School, alternative school, Tuba City Junior High School, Eagles Nest Intermediate School, and the Dzil Libei Elementary School, Tsinaabaas Habitiin Elementary School, and Tuba CIty Elementary School.

In addition to Tuba City it serves Cameron, Moenkopi, Tonalea, and a section of Kaibeto.

References

External links
 

School districts in Coconino County, Arizona
Education on the Navajo Nation